Tugonica is a village in Zagorje, Croatia. It is connected by the D29 highway.

References

Populated places in Krapina-Zagorje County